The men's high jump event at the 2010 Asian Games was held at the Aoti Main Stadium, Guangzhou, China on 21–23 November.

Schedule
All times are China Standard Time (UTC+08:00)

Records

Results

Qualifying
 Qualification: Qualifying performance 2.20 (Q) or at least 12 best performers (q) advance to the final.

Final

References

Results

Athletics at the 2010 Asian Games
2010